Robert Ferber was a marketing theorist, statistician, economist, and psychologist. He was a Professor of Business at the University of Illinois. He was the founding editor-in-chief of Journal of Marketing Research and the second editor of Journal of Consumer Research. He is a former president of the American Marketing Association. The Ferber Award given to the best dissertation-based article published in the Journal of Consumer Research is named after him. He founded the Survey Research Laboratory (SRL) at University of Illinois. He was married to Marianne Ferber. He was a fellow of the American Statistical Association.

Books and monographs
Ferber, Robert. Handbook of Marketing Research. New York: McGraw-Hill, 1974.
Ferber, Robert, and Hugh G. Wales. Motivation and Market Behavior. Homewood, Ill: R.D. Irwin, 1958.
Ferber, Robert, and P J. Verdoorn. Research Methods in Economics & Business. New York: Macmillan, 1962.
Ferber, Robert, and Werner Z. Hirsch. Social Experimentation and Economic Policy. Cambridge: Cambridge University Press, 1982.
Ferber, Robert, and Hugh G. Wales. A Basic Bibliography on Marketing Research. Chicago: American Marketing Association, 1974.

Selected research publications
Ferber, Robert. "Research on household behavior." The American Economic Review 52, no. 1 (1962): 19-63.
Ferber, Robert. "The expanding role of marketing in the 1970s." Journal of Marketing 34, no. 1 (1970): 29-30.
Ferber, Robert. "Item nonresponse in a consumer survey." Public Opinion Quarterly 30, no. 3 (1966): 399-415.

References

External links
 In Memoriam
 Robert Ferber

1922 births
1981 deaths
Fellows of the American Statistical Association
Marketing people
University of Illinois faculty
Journal of Marketing Research editors